Kalemie Airport  is an airport serving Kalemie in Tanganyika Province (formerly Katanga Province) and on Lake Tanganyika, in the southeastern Democratic Republic of the Congo.

Airlines and destinations

See also
Transport in the Democratic Republic of the Congo
List of airports in the Democratic Republic of the Congo

References

External links
 FallingRain - Kalemie Airport

 OurAirports - Kalemie Airport

Airports in Tanganyika Province
Kalemie